Uguzevo (Ügäź) is a rural locality (a selo) and the administrative centre of Uguzevsky Selsoviet, Birsky District, Bashkortostan, Russia. The population was 414 as of 2010. There are 8 streets.

Geography 
Uguzevo is located 25 km southeast of Birsk (the district's administrative centre) by road. Chishma is the nearest rural locality.

References 

Rural localities in Birsky District